Anna Dmitrievna Afonasieva (born 2001) is a Russian chess player. She was awarded the title of Woman International Master in 2020.

Chess career 

She qualified for the Women's Chess World Cup 2021, where she was defeated 2-0 by Peng Zhaoqin in the first round.

References

External links

Anna Afonasieva chess games at 365Chess.com

2001 births
Living people
Russian female chess players
People from Obninsk
Chess Woman International Masters